Crossways, also known as Henry Place, is a Late Victorian building in Aiken, South Carolina.  It was built in 1868. It was listed on the National Register of Historic Places in 1997.

References

Houses on the National Register of Historic Places in South Carolina
Houses completed in 1868
National Register of Historic Places in Aiken County, South Carolina
Houses in Aiken County, South Carolina
Buildings and structures in Aiken, South Carolina